Crassispira conica is an extinct species of sea snail, a marine gastropod mollusk in the family Pseudomelatomidae, the turrids and allies. The length of the shell attains 48 mm. Fossils have been found in Miocene strata in Colombia and Venezuela; age range: 15.97 to 13.65 Ma.

References

 D. J. Thomas. 1972. The Tertiary geology and systematic paleontology (phylum Mollusca) of the Guajira Peninsula, Colombia, South America. PhD dissertation. State University of New York at Binghamton 1-138

External links
 Fossilshells.nl: Crassispira conica

conica
Gastropods described in 1965